Allan or Alan Fraser may refer to:
Allan Fraser (Australian politician) (1902–1977)
Allan Fraser (musician) (born 1948), Canadian folk musician and songwriter
Allan Fraser (Canadian politician) (1906–1969)
Allan Fraser (footballer) (born 1982), Scottish footballer in Hong Kong
Allen Fraser (New York politician) in 44th New York State Legislature
Alan Fraser (cricketer) (1892–1962), Scottish cricketer

See also
 Alan Fraser Davies (1924–1987), Australian political scientist and author